Tischeria antilope is a moth of the family Tischeriidae. It is known from Namibia.

References

Endemic fauna of Namibia
Tischeriidae
Insects of Namibia
Moths of Africa
Moths described in 2003